Synalissa is a genus of lichen within the family Lichinaceae. It contains two species.

References

External links
Synalissa at Index Fungorum

Lichinomycetes
Lichen genera
Taxa named by Elias Magnus Fries
Taxa described in 1825